Lonsdale was a marque of car sold in the United Kingdom by the Colt Car Company between 1982 and 1984. It took its name from the industrial suburb of Lonsdale in Adelaide, South Australia where Mitsubishi Australia had an engine production facility. The only car sold under this brand was the Lonsdale, a badge engineered Mitsubishi Sigma (GJ). It was sold as the Lonsdale YD41 and the Lonsdale YD45. 700 were produced.

The car was powered by one of three four cylinder engines of 1.6, 2.0 and 2.6 litres, producing respectively 81, 95 and 103 bhp.

The largest of these power units produced a maximum torque of 192 Nm., and was one of the largest post-war four cylinder engines produced.

Although the Sigma was merely an Australian version of Mitsubishi Motors' Colt Galant which was already available in the UK, the company's plan was to circumvent the "gentlemen's agreement", a voluntary import quota which limited Japanese-manufactured imports to 11 per cent of the market (which typically amounted to fewer than 200,000 cars per year). However, the idea proved unsuccessful and most of the cars imported by Lonsdale remained unsold by the time the company ceased trading. The Colt Car Company continued to sell the vehicle in the UK for 1984, although rebranded as the Mitsubishi Galant.

See also

Colt Car Company
 List of car manufacturers of the United Kingdom

References

External links
BBC Top Gear 10 Forgotten cars - Lonsdale

Mitsubishi Motors subsidiaries
Defunct brands